Fasād is an Arabic word meaning rottenness, corruption, or depravity. In an Islamic context it can refer to spreading corruption on Earth or spreading mischief in a Muslim land, moral corruption against God, or disturbance of the public peace. 

The spread of fasad is a major theme in the Quran, and the notion is often contrasted with islah (setting things aright). Classical Quranic commentators commonly interpreted "corruption in the land" as open disobedience against God or its result. In certain contexts, classical jurists took it to refer to the legal category of Hirabah, comprising armed assault, rape and murder. Some contemporary Muslims view destruction of the natural environment to be among the central meanings of verses referring to fasad.

In recent decades, the term has been used in the legal codes of the Islamic Republics of Pakistan and Iran. In Iran, laws referencing it have been used to prosecute or threaten political opposition figures.

In Islamic scripture

Quran

The spread of fasad is a major theme in the Quran, and the notion is often contrasted with islah (setting things aright). 

Terms derived from the verbal root f-s-d appear in a number of Quranic verses. The verb afsad (to cause fasad) appears, for example, in chapter 2 (Al-Baqara), verse 11-12, When it is said to them: "Make not mischief on the earth," they say: "Why, we only Want to make peace!" Of a surety, they are the ones who make mischief, but they realise (it) not. – 

Classical Quranic commentators commonly interpreted spreading "corruption in the land" or "mischief on the earth" as open disobedience against God or its result. Some contemporary Muslims view destruction of the natural environment to be among the central meanings of these verses.

In chapter 5 (Al-Ma'ida) of Qur'an, verse 33 contains the expression "to strive mischievously in the land" (yas'awna fi-l-ardi fasadan):

The punishment of those who wage war against Allah and His Messenger, and strive to spread corruption through the land is: execution, or crucifixion, or the cutting off of hands and feet from opposite sides, or exile from the land: that is their disgrace in this world, and a heavy punishment is theirs in the Hereafter. – 

The scope of this verse has been limited by most classical commentators to the armed crimes falling under the legal category of Hirabah, which comprises armed robbery, assault (including rape), and murder, particularly of innocent travelers on the road.  A "small minority" viewed this verse as applying to apostates in general. This verse follows verses 26-31 which refer to the incident in which Qabil (Cain), son of Adam, killed his brother Habil (Abel).

Those who cause mischief in the land (yufsiduna fi al-ard) are counted as "the losers" in Al-Baqara, verse 27:

Those who break the covenant of Allah after ratifying it, and sever that which Allah ordered to be joined, and (who) make mischief in the earth: Those are they who are the losers. –

The word "losers" indicates being bereft of something, and can also mean "being lost", in the sense of losing one's way or one's self.

Hadiths

Mischief has a broad meaning in Sahih Bukhari and other texts of Islam.

Breaking ties with one's Muslim kith and kin is stated to be a form of fasad in Book 73 of Sahih Bukhari,

The Prophet said, "Allah created the creations, and when He finished from His creations, Ar-Rahm (womb) said, "(O Allah) at this place I seek refuge with You from all those who sever the ties of kith and kin. Allah said, 'Yes, won't you be pleased that I will keep good relations with the one who will keep good relations with you, and I will sever the relation with the one who will sever the relations with you.' Allah's Apostle added. "Read (in the Qur'an) if you wish, the Statement of Allah: 'Would you then, if you were given the authority, do mischief in the land and sever your ties of kinship?' –

Sunan Abu Dawud confirms that the required punishment for fasad is execution or crucifixion.

When the Apostle of Allah cut off (the hands and feet of) those who had stolen his camels and he had their eyes put out by fire (heated nails), Allah reprimanded him on that (action), and Allah, the Exalted, revealed: "The punishment of those who wage war against Allah and His Apostle and strive with might and main for mischief through the land is execution or crucifixion." –

Sunan Abu Dawud, in 38.4359, states that the punishment for fasad was revealed for polytheists.

In modern politics and law

Pakistan
Pakistan law includes the principle of fasad-fil-arz (corruption on earth), which allows an offender to be punished (with a sentence of up to 14 years of imprisonment) even if they are forgiven by the victim's party under Qisas and Diyat.

Iran
After the Islamic revolution in Iran, suspected royalists were purged from the civil service and the army with justifications that employed the Quranic notions of fasad and fitna. The clerical leadership attempted to present this campaign as analogous to the actions of the Islamic prophet Muhammad and Ali ibn Abi Talib. Acting as the prayer leader of Tehran, Ayatollah Ali Montazeri commented that Muhammad was sent by God "to salvage [the inhabitants of Mecca] from corrupted moralities [mafasid akhlaq]". He identified fasad with "plotters, spies and traitors in government offices and institutions" and warned that failure to take action against it would put an end to "the sciences, the arts and progress".

In the Islamic Republic of Iran the offense is known as Mofsed-e-filarz and is a capital crime. The charge was used by Islamic Republican judicial authorities in the early days of the Iranian Revolution, resulting in many imprisonments and executions. Possibly more than 8,000 people suffered that fate, ranging from former members of the Shah's government, leaders of opposition or terrorist groups, or simply opponents of the regime. It has been used against leaders of the Baháʼí Faith on a number of occasions, and in February 2011 a large majority of members of the Iranian parliament called for the prosecution and execution of Iranian opposition leaders Mehdi Karroubi and Mir-Hossein Mousavi on the charge of mofsed-e-filarz.

See also
 Apostasy in Islam
 Corruption
 Mofsed-e-filarz
 War crime

References

Arabic words and phrases in Sharia
Islam and capital punishment
Islamic terminology